David Henry may refer to:

David Henry (Gaelic footballer), Gaelic footballer with the Dublin county team
David Henry (bodybuilder) (born 1975), American bodybuilder
David Henry (businessman) (1888–1963), Scottish-born New Zealand industrialist, company director and philanthropist
David Joseph Henry, English writer, activist and parliamentary candidate
David Henry (cricketer) (born 1947), New Zealand cricketer
David Henry (Australian footballer) (born 1956), Australian rules footballer
David Morrison Reid Henry (1919–1977), British illustrator of birds
David Eugene Henry (born 1946), American painter and sculptor

See also
David Henrie (born 1989), American actor
Reid David Henry, guitarist at My Darkest Days, lead singer of Deadset Society

Henry (surname)